Margaretta Amelia Foster, 1st Viscountess Ferrard (née Burgh; c. 1737 – 20 January 1824), was an Anglo-Irish peeress and wife of John Foster, 1st Baron Oriel who was the last Speaker of the Irish House of Commons.

She was the daughter of Thomas Burgh and Anne Downes, daughter of Dive Downes, Bishop of Cork and Ross, and his fourth wife Lady Catherine Fitzgerald. On 14 December 1764, she married the politician John Foster. On 5 June 1790, she was raised to the Peerage of Ireland as Baroness Oriel in her own right. The title was created in honour of her husband, but in such a way that would enable him to continue to serve as Speaker of the Irish House of Commons (1785–1800). On 22 November 1797, she was further honoured when she was made Viscountess Ferrard. Her husband was created Baron Oriel in his own right in 1821.

Family 
Viscountess Ferrard had three children. She was succeeded in her titles by her eldest surviving son by John Foster, Thomas, who also succeeded to his father's barony on his death in 1828.

References

Year of birth unknown
1824 deaths
18th-century Anglo-Irish people
19th-century Anglo-Irish people
Viscounts in the Peerage of Ireland
Year of birth uncertain
Hereditary peeresses of Ireland created by George III
House of Burgh
1737 births